The Borough of Maidstone is a local government district with borough status in Kent, England. Its administrative centre is Maidstone, the county town of Kent.

The borough was formed on 1 April 1974 by the merger of the Municipal Borough of Maidstone with the rural districts of Maidstone and Hollingbourne, under the Local Government Act 1972.

Position
The borough covers an area generally to the east and south of the town of Maidstone: as far north as the M2 motorway; east down the M20 to Lenham; south to a line including Staplehurst and Headcorn; and west towards Tonbridge. Generally speaking, it lies between the North Downs and the Weald, and covers the central part of the county. The M20 motorway crosses it from west to east, as does High Speed 1.

Geologically, the Greensand ridge lies to the south of the town. The very fine sand provides a good source for glass-making. The clay vale beyond, through which flow the three rivers which meet at Yalding; the Medway, the Beult and the Teise; and the chalk North Downs all provide raw materials for paper- and cement-making; which are also local industries.

Governance

Maidstone Borough represents the second tier of local government, being one of the local government districts of Kent. The Borough Council consists of 55 councillors, representing voters from 26 wards. Twelve of those wards are within the urban area of Maidstone: they are Allington; Bridge; Downswood & Otham; East ward; Fant; Heath; High Street; North ward; Park Wood; Shepway North; Shepway South; and South ward. The remaining 14 wards cover rural districts.

From 1983 to 2008 no party had a majority on Maidstone Borough Council, but the Conservative party gained a majority at the 2008 election. The council reverted to No Overall Control in 2014. As of February 2019 the council has 24 Conservative, 21 Liberal Democrat, 5 Independent Maidstone, 2 independent and 3 Labour party councillors.

The council is based in the town centre having replaced its many small offices with one large building called Maidstone Gateway. The shopfront appearance is intended to make it easier to access information and services.

The third tier of local government is the civil parish; in Maidstone some of the parishes have neither a parish council nor a parish meeting, as indicated (1) :

Transport

Water
The River Medway was the earliest form of transport through the area. It was navigable for cargo-carrying craft as far upstream as Tonbridge, and it was only in the 19th century that the railways brought any change. More recently, various works have been carried out to control the frequent flooding in the clay vale upstream of Maidstone.

Roads
Maidstone, as its importance warranted, has been the hub of roads for many centuries. It lies very close to the Pilgrims' Way; and two Roman roads met south of the town: one from Rochester to Hastings the other branching off to the East Kent coast and Dover.

In the 18th century came the turnpiked roads. One of the earliest in the county – that to Rochester and Chatham – was opened in 1728.

In modern times, two motorways – the M2 and the M20 – pass to the far north of the borough and just north of the town centre of Maidstone respectively.

Railways
The earliest line through Kent was built by the South Eastern Railway. It was not, however, built to pass through Maidstone: instead, a station was built at Paddock Wood railway station, then named Maidstone Road, some six miles away. It was only in the period between 1844 (when that main line was connected by a branch line to Maidstone) and 1884 that Maidstone became a hub once more, although with local trains only, to Strood, Ashford and via Swanley Junction to London.

Mayors

Political control
See Maidstone Borough Council elections for historic political control and leadership.

Locations
Maidstone Borough Council is based at Maidstone House on King Street, Maidstone. Meetings are also held at Maidstone Town Hall.

References

Video clips
 Maidstone Council YouTube channel

 
Non-metropolitan districts of Kent
Boroughs in England